The 2001 Pittsburgh Steelers season was the franchise's 69th season as a professional sports franchise and as a member of the National Football League. After finishing the previous three seasons a combined 22–26, the Steelers returned to the top seed in the AFC, rolling to a 13–3 record in their first playoff berth and AFC Central title since 1997 and playing at Heinz Field. The Steelers went 7–1 in their new home stadium, with the only loss coming to the defending Super Bowl champion Baltimore Ravens (a loss the Steelers avenged in the divisional playoffs).

However, for the third time in Bill Cowher's coaching tenure, the Steelers fell in the AFC Championship Game at home. This time, the eventual champion New England Patriots upset the top-seeded Steelers.

Offseason

NFL draft

Personnel

Notable additions include Casey Hampton, Jeff Hartings and Kendrell Bell.

Roster

Preseason

Schedule

Regular season

Schedule

Standings

Game summaries

Week 1 (Sunday September 9, 2001): at Jacksonville Jaguars

at Alltel Stadium, Jacksonville, Florida

 Game time: 1:00 pm EDT
 Game weather: 83° F (sunny and rain)
 Game attendance: 63,785
 Referee: Mack Gentry
 TV announcers: (CBS) Don Criqui (play by play), Craig James (color commentator), Beasley Reece (sideline reporter)

- (Sunday September 16, 2001): vs. Cleveland Browns
Due to the September 11th attacks the National Football League postponed all games. It was played after the rest of the scheduled season had been completed.

Week 2 (Sunday September 23, 2001): Bye Week

Week 3 (Sunday September 30, 2001): at Buffalo Bills

at Ralph Wilson Stadium, Orchard Park, New York

 Game time: 1:00 pm EDT
 Game weather: 63° F (sunny)
 Game attendance: 72,874
 Referee: Tom White
 TV announcers: (CBS) Ian Eagle (play by play), Solomon Wilcots (color commentator)

Week 4 (Sunday October 7, 2001): vs. Cincinnati Bengals

at Heinz Field, Pittsburgh, Pennsylvania

 Game time: 1:00 pm EDT
 Game weather: 46 °F (Partly Cloudy)
 Game attendance: 62,335
 Referee: Larry Nemmers
 TV announcers: (CBS) Bill Macatee (play by play), Trevor Matich (color commentator)

This was the first game at Heinz Field. Also Jerome Bettis passed 10,000 yards rushing for his career.

Week 5 (Sunday October 14, 2001): at Kansas City Chiefs

at Arrowhead Stadium, Kansas City, Missouri

 Game time: 1:00 pm EDT
 Game weather: 57°F (sunny)
 Game attendance: 78,413 
 Referee: Ron Blum
 TV announcers: (CBS) Gus Johnson (play by play), Brent Jones (color commentator)

Week 6 (Sunday October 21, 2001): at Tampa Bay Buccaneers

at Raymond James Stadium, Tampa, Florida

 Game time: 1:00 pm EDT
 Game weather: 84°F (partly cloudy/rain)
 Game attendance: 65,588
 Referee: Ed Hochuli
 TV announcers: (CBS) Dick Enberg (play by play), Dan Dierdorf (color commentator), Bonnie Bernstein (sideline reporter)

Week 7 (Monday October 29, 2001): vs. Tennessee Titans

at Heinz Field, Pittsburgh, Pennsylvania

 Game time: 9:00 pm EST
 Game weather: 51 °F (Cloudy)
 Game attendance: 63,763
 Referee: Terry McAulay
 TV announcers: (ABC) Al Michaels (play by play), Dan Fouts & Dennis Miller (color commentators), Eric Dickerson & Melissa Stark (sideline reporters)

Week 8 (Sunday November 4, 2001): vs. Baltimore Ravens

at Heinz Field, Pittsburgh, Pennsylvania

 Game time: 1:00 pm EST
 Game weather: 63 °F (Partly Cloudy)
 Game attendance: 62,906
 Referee: Bob McElwee
 TV announcers: (CBS) Dick Enberg (play by play), Dan Dierdorf (color commentator), Bonnie Bernstein (sideline reporter)

Week 9 (Sunday November 11, 2001): at Cleveland Browns

at Cleveland Browns Stadium, Cleveland, Ohio

 Game time: 1:00 pm EST
 Game weather: 42°F (cloudy)
 Game attendance: 73,218
 Referee: Dick Hantak
 TV announcers: (CBS) Ian Eagle (play by play), Solomon Wilcots (color commentator)

Week 10 (Sunday November 18, 2001): vs. Jacksonville Jaguars

at Heinz Field, Pittsburgh, Pennsylvania

 Game time: 4:05 pm EST
 Game weather: 57 °F (Mostly Cloudy)
 Game attendance: 62,644
 Referee: Ron Winter
 TV announcers: (CBS) Ian Eagle (play by play), Solomon Wilcots (color commentator)

Week 11 (Sunday November 25, 2001): at Tennessee Titans

at Adelphia Coliseum, Nashville, Tennessee

 Game time: 1:00 pm EST
 Game weather: 63°F (sunny)
 Game attendance: 68,801
 Referee: Bill Leavy
 TV announcers: (CBS) Dick Enberg (play by play), Dan Dierdorf (color commentator), Bonnie Bernstein (sideline reporter)

Week 12 (Sunday December 2, 2001): vs. Minnesota Vikings

at Heinz Field, Pittsburgh, Pennsylvania

 Game time: 1:00 pm EST
 Game weather: 48 °F (Sunny)
 Game attendance: 62,661
 Referee: Tony Corrente
 TV announcers: (Fox) Dick Stockton (play by play), Troy Aikman & Daryl Johnston (color commentators), Pam Oliver (sideline reporter)

Week 13 (Sunday December 9, 2001): vs. New York Jets

at Heinz Field, Pittsburgh, Pennsylvania

 Game time: 4:15 pm EST
 Game weather: 41 °F (Cloudy)
 Game attendance: 62,884
 Referee: Terry McAulay
 TV announcers: (CBS) Greg Gumbel (play by play), Phil Simms (color commentator), Armen Keteyian (sideline reporter)

Week 14 (Sunday December 16, 2001): at Baltimore Ravens

at PSINet Stadium, Baltimore, Maryland

 Game time: 8:30 pm EST
 Game weather: 42°F
 Game attendance: 69,506
 Referee: Tom White
 TV announcers: (ESPN) Mike Patrick (play by play), Joe Theismann & Paul Maguire (color commentators), Suzy Kolber (sideline reporter)

Week 15 (Sunday December 23, 2001): vs. Detroit Lions

at Heinz Field, Pittsburgh, Pennsylvania

 Game time: 1:00 pm EST
 Game weather: 43 °F (Light Rain)
 Game attendance: 62,809
 Referee: Johnny Grier
 TV announcers: (Fox) Kenny Albert (play by play), Tim Green (color commentator), Jennifer Hammond (sideline reporter)

Week 16 (Sunday December 30, 2001): at Cincinnati Bengals

at Paul Brown Stadium, Cincinnati, Ohio

 Game time: 1:00 pm EST
 Game weather: 20 °F (Partly Cloudy)
 Game attendance: 63,751
 Referee: Jeff Triplette
 TV announcers: (CBS) Gus Johnson (play by play), Brent Jones (color commentator)

Week 17 (Sunday January 6, 2002): vs. Cleveland Browns

at Heinz Field, Pittsburgh, Pennsylvania

 Game time: 1:00 pm EST
 Game weather: 32 °F (Rain & Snow)
 Game attendance: 59,189
 Referee: Bernie Kukar
 TV announcers: (CBS) Gus Johnson (play by play), Brent Jones (color commentator)

Playoffs

Schedule

Game summaries

AFC Divisional Playoff (Sunday January 20, 2002): vs. Baltimore Ravens

at Heinz Field, Pittsburgh, Pennsylvania

 Game time: 12:30 pm EST
 Game weather: 30 °F (Mostly Cloudy)
 Game attendance: 63,976
 Referee: Tony Corrente
 TV announcers: (CBS) Dick Enberg (play by play), Dan Dierdorf (color commentator), Bonnie Bernstein (sideline reporter)

AFC Championship Game (Sunday January 27, 2002): vs. New England Patriots

at Heinz Field, Pittsburgh, Pennsylvania

 Game time: 12:30 pm EST
 Game weather: 57 °F (Mostly Cloudy)
 Game attendance: 64,704
 Referee: Ed Hochuli
 TV announcers: (CBS) Greg Gumbel (play by play), Phil Simms (color commentator), Armen Keteyian & Bonnie Bernstein (sideline reporters)

Honors and awards

Pro Bowl Representatives 
See: 2002 Pro Bowl

 No. 10 Kordell Stewart-Quarterback
 No. 36 Jerome Bettis-Running Back
 No. 66 Alan Faneca-Offensive Guard
 No. 86 Hines Ward-Wide Receiver
 No. 92 Jason Gildon-Outside Linebacker
 No. 97 Kendrell Bell-Inside Linebacker (as "need" player)

References

External links 
 2001 Pittsburgh Steelers season at Pro Football Reference 
 2001 Pittsburgh Steelers season statistics at jt-sw.com 
 Recap at NFL.com

Pittsburgh Steelers seasons
Pittsburgh Steelers
AFC Central championship seasons
Pitts